Ruud Knol (born 13 March 1981) is a Dutch former professional footballer who played as a centre back.

Club career
Knol was born in Zevenaar, in the province of Gelderland and started his career at OBW Zevenaar, where he was spotted by Vitesse Arnhem scouts.

Knol made his debut in professional football, being part of the Vitesse squad in the 2000–01 season. He played six years for Vitesse and was called up once by then Dutch coach Louis van Gaal for the Netherlands national football team. A serious injury threatened his career between 2002 and 2005 but he came back to play for Vitesse. In summer 2007 he moved abroad but after only one season in Greece he returned to the Netherlands and joined Sparta.

External links
 Career stats – Voetbal International

References

1981 births
Living people
People from Zevenaar
Association football central defenders
Dutch footballers
Dutch expatriate footballers
SBV Vitesse players
PAOK FC players
Sparta Rotterdam players
Eredivisie players
Eerste Divisie players
Super League Greece players
Expatriate footballers in Greece
Footballers from Gelderland
Dutch expatriate sportspeople in Greece
21st-century Dutch people